Mahmoud Hassan Saleh (born 4 May 1962) is an Egyptian footballer. He competed in the men's tournament at the 1984 Summer Olympics.

References

External links
 
 

1962 births
Living people
Egyptian footballers
Egypt international footballers
Olympic footballers of Egypt
Footballers at the 1984 Summer Olympics
Place of birth missing (living people)
Association football forwards
Ismaily SC players